Oliver or Ollie Brown may refer to:
Oliver Brown (American activist) (1918–1961), plaintiff in the case Brown v. Board of Education
Oliver Brown (baseball) (1849–1932), American baseball player
Oliver Brown (footballer) (1908–1953), English footballer, also known as Buster Brown, active in the 1930s
Oliver Brown (snooker player) (born 1994), English snooker player
Oliver C. Brown (born 1946), American percussionist
Ollie Brown (baseball) (1944–2015), Major League Baseball player
Ollie E. Brown (born 1953), American drummer and record producer, half of duo Ollie & Jerry
Oli Brown (born 1990), British blues musician
Oliver Brown (died 1859), son of abolitionist John Brown
Oliver Brown (Scottish activist) (1903–1976), Scottish nationalist activist
Ollie Brown (racing driver) (born 1983), British racing driver